Tiberio Cruz Fortunato (born 15 December 1976 in Barrancabermeja, Colombia) is a Colombian actor.

Filmography
2014 - La Suegra .... Carolina López de Burgos
2012-2013 - El Patron Del Mal  ....
2011-12 - Corazón de fuego .... Fernando 
 2010 - El Clon ....Zein
 2009 - Victorinos ....Gary Estupiñan
 2009 - Bella Calamidades ....Román Galeano
 2008 - Doña Barbara ....Pajarote
 2008 - La traición ....Hercules
 2006 - Los Reyes ....Edgar Galindo
 2003 - Amor a la plancha ....Hernán Cachón
 1999 - Dios se lo pague ....Fredy
 1998 - ¡Ay cosita linda mamá! ....Alex

Series

 2007 - Zona rosa (serie) ....Julio
 2006 - Decisiones ....José Miguel

Movies

 2003 - Perder es cuestión de método ....Vladimir
 2002 - Siguiendo el rastro ....

Reality Show

 2002 - Protagonistas de Novela

Commercial

 2003 - Speed Stick
 2002 - Coordinadora Mercantil
 2001 - Colcelco
 1998 - AV Villas
 1998 - BellSouth

References

Colombian male telenovela actors
Colombian male film actors
Colombian male television actors
1976 births
Living people